Peace of Nisibis may refer to the following treaties signed in Nisibis (modern Nusaybin, Turkey):

Peace of Nisibis (299), between the Roman Empire and the Sasanian Empire, ended the Roman-Sassanian War of 296–299
Peace of Nisibis (363), between the Roman Empire and the Sasanian Empire, ended the Perso-Roman War of 363

See also
 List of Byzantine foreign treaties
 List of treaties